The 1912 Boston Red Sox season was the 12th season in the franchise's Major League Baseball history. This was the first year that the team played its home games at Fenway Park. The Red Sox finished first in the American League (AL) with a record of 105 wins and 47 losses. The team set the franchise record for highest winning percentage (.691) in a season, which still stands; tied the franchise record for fewest losses in a season, originally set by the 1903 team; and set a franchise record for most wins, which was not surpassed until the 2018 club.

The team then faced the National League (NL) champion New York Giants in the 1912 World Series, which the Red Sox won in eight games to capture the franchise's second World Series. One of the deciding plays in the World Series was a muffed fly ball by Giants outfielder Fred Snodgrass, which became known as the "$30,000 muff" in reference to the prize money for the winning team.

Behind center fielder Tris Speaker and pitcher Smoky Joe Wood, the Red Sox led the league in runs scored and fewest runs allowed. Speaker was third in batting and was voted league Most Valuable Player. Wood won 34 games, including a record 16 in a row. Although the pitching staff was satisfactory, the only star pitcher was Wood, while the only star in the starting lineup was Speaker. Little-known third baseman Larry Gardner was the next best hitter, while future Hall of Famer Harry Hooper had a poor offensive season.

Offseason 
The Red Sox made several transactions during the 1912 offseason. In February 1912, Rip Williams was sold to the New York Highlanders, although the exact date of the transaction is currently unknown. The Red Sox sold two players to the Chicago White Sox during the offseason: Jack Fournier on February 6 and Eddie Cicotte on July 9. Later in the year, on November 25, Hugh Bradley was sold to the Jersey City Giants minor league baseball team of the International League. The only purchase made by the Red Sox that offseason was their purchase of Neal Ball from the Cleveland Naps on June 25 for $2500.

Regular season

The new Red Sox home stadium, Fenway Park opened on April 20, the same day as Navin Field in Detroit opened. It was supposed to be opened on April 18 (like Navin Field) but it rained in both cities on that day.

On April 26, Hugh Bradley became the first player to hit a home run over the Green Monster at Fenway Park. It was his only home run of the 1912 season, and one of only two he hit in his career, which spanned five seasons.

Season standings

Record vs. opponents

Opening Day lineup

On April 11, 1912, the Red Sox defeated the New York Highlanders 5–3 in an away game.

Roster

Player stats

Batting
Note: Pos = Position; G = Games played; AB = At bats; H = Hits; Avg. = Batting average; HR = Home runs; RBI = Runs batted in

Starters by position

Other batters
Note: G = Games played; AB = At bats; H = Hits; Avg. = Batting average; HR = Home runs; RBI = Runs batted in

Pitching
Note: G = Games pitched; IP = Innings pitched; W = Wins; L = Losses; ERA = Earned run average; SO = Strikeouts

Starting pitchers

Other pitchers
Note: G = Games pitched; IP = Innings pitched; W = Wins; L = Losses; ERA = Earned run average; SO = Strikeouts

Relief pitchers
Note: G = Games pitched; W = Wins; L = Losses; SV = Saves; ERA = Earned run average; SO = Strikeouts

Awards and honors

League top five finishers
Duffy Lewis
 #2 in AL in RBI (109)

Tris Speaker
 MLB leader in on-base percentage (.464)
 AL leader in home runs (10)
 #2 in AL in runs scored (136)
 #3 in AL in batting average (.383)
 #3 in AL in slugging percentage (.567)
 #4 in AL in stolen bases (52)

Smoky Joe Wood
 MLB leader in wins (34)
 MLB leader in shutouts (10)
 #2 in AL in ERA (1.91)
 #2 in AL in strikeouts (258)

World Series

The 1912 World Series was played between the New York Giants of the NL and the Red Sox of the AL. The Red Sox won in eight games, 4–3, having played the Giants to a tie in Game 2.

AL Boston Red Sox (4) vs. NL New York Giants (3)

See also
 List of Boston Red Sox team records

References

Further reading

External links
1912 Boston Red Sox at Baseball Reference
1912 Boston Red Sox season at Baseball Almanac

Boston Red Sox seasons
Boston Red Sox
Boston Red Sox
1910s in Boston
American League champion seasons
World Series champion seasons